Meera Chopra, is an Indian actress and model who appears in Tamil, Telugu, and Hindi-language films. In Tamil films, she is credited as Nila.

Personal life
Meera is a cousin of Indian actresses Priyanka Chopra and Parineeti Chopra.

Film career 
Meera's Tamil debut was with the 2005 film Anbe Aaruyire, in which she starred with S. J. Surya. Her second film was a Telugu-language film in a supporting role with Pawan Kalyan, followed by her critically acclaimed performance in M. S. Raju's Vaana. Much later she made her Bollywood debut in Vikram Bhatt's 1920: London, with Sharman Joshi. She's also worked in Satish Kaushik's Gang of Ghosts, produced by Venus. Meera is set to work in Nastik (upcoming film) opposite Arjun Rampal, which is set to release in late 2021. She played Anjali Dangle in a 2019 film Section 375, with Akshaye Khanna and Richa Chaddha.

Filmography

Television

References

External links 

 
 
 

Living people
Actresses in Tamil cinema
Actresses in Kannada cinema
Actresses in Telugu cinema
Actresses in Hindi cinema
21st-century Indian actresses
Indian film actresses
Year of birth missing (living people)